William W. Seeley (born 1971) is an American neurologist. He is a Professor of Neurology and Pathology at the UCSF Memory and Aging Center at the University of California, San Francisco (UCSF). He leads the Selective Vulnerability Research Lab at UCSF. He is a 2011 MacArthur Fellow.

Life
Seeley graduated from Brown University in 1994, and from the UCSF School of Medicine. He was an internal medicine intern at UCSF and a neurology resident at the Massachusetts General Hospital and Brigham and Women's Hospital.

He is on the editorial board of Acta Neuropathologica and Neuroimage Clinical. He is also Director of the UCSF Neurodegenerative Disease Brain Bank. His research concerns regional vulnerability in neurodegenerative disease such as frontotemporal dementia and Alzheimer's disease.

Works

References

External links
 Selective Vulnerability Research Lab at UCSF
 

American neuroscientists
MacArthur Fellows
University of California, San Francisco alumni
UCSF School of Medicine faculty
Brown University alumni
1971 births
Living people